The 29th Battalion (Vancouver), CEF was an infantry battalion of the Canadian Expeditionary Force during the Great War.

History 
Known as "Tobin's Tigers", the battalion was authorized on 7 November 1914 and embarked for Britain on 20 May 1915. It disembarked in France on 17 September 1915, where it fought as part of the 6th Canadian Infantry Brigade, 2nd Canadian Division in France and Flanders until the end of the war. The battalion was disbanded on 30 August 1920.

The 29th Battalion recruited in Vancouver and New Westminster, British Columbia and was mobilized at Vancouver.

Raised by Lieutenant-Colonel Tobin on 24 October 1914 in Vancouver, British Columbia, the 29th derived its manpower from the Duke of Connaught's Own Rifles and the Irish Fusiliers of Canada. The SS Missanabie transported the battalion to England in May 1915. Subordinated to the 6th Canadian Brigade, 2nd Canadian Division, the 29th consisted of 37 officers and 1,104 other ranks.

The 29th Battalion had eight Commanding Officers:

Lt.-Col. H.S. Tobin, 20 May 1915 – 20 July 1916
Lt.-Col. J.S. Tait, 20 August 1916 – 10 September 1916
Lt.-Col. J.M. Ross, 10 September 1916 – 16 December 1916
Lt.-Col. J.S. Tait, 16 December 1916 – 22 January 1917
Lt.-Col. J.M. Ross, DSO, 22 January 1917 – 23 July 1917
Lt.-Col. W.S. Latta, DSO, 23 July 1917 – 16 August 1918
Maj. L.A. Wilmot, MC, 16 August 1918 – 5 September 1918
Lt.-Col. H.S. Tobin, DSO, 5 September 1918-Demobilization

One member of the 29th Battalion, Company Sergeant-Major (Warrant Officer Class II) Robert Hill Hanna was awarded the Victoria Cross for his actions on August 21, 1917, at Hill 70 near Lens, France.

Battle Honours 
The 29th Battalion was awarded the following battle honours:

MOUNT SORREL
SOMME, 1916, '18
Flers-Courcelette
Thiepval
Ancre Heights
ARRAS, 1917, '18
Vimy, 1917
Scarpe, 1917, '18
HILL 70
Ypres 1917
Passchendaele
AMIENS
HINDENBURG LINE
Drocourt-Quéant
Canal du Nord
Cambrai, 1918
PURSUIT TO MONS
FRANCE AND FLANDERS, 1915–18

Perpetuation 
The 29 Battalion's lineage was perpetuated by the 2nd Battalion, British Columbia Regiment – constituted in 1920. Subsequent amalgamation in 1936 absorbed the 29th's history into that of the Irish Fusiliers of Canada (The Vancouver Regiment), which was placed on the Supplementary Order of Battle in 1965. On 13 June 2002, The Irish Fusiliers of Canada (The Vancouver Regiment) was amalgamated with The British Columbia Regiment (Duke of Connaught's Own).

The 29th Battalion is currently perpetuated by The British Columbia Regiment (Duke of Connaught's Own).

See also 

 List of infantry battalions in the Canadian Expeditionary Force

Sources

Canadian Expeditionary Force 1914–1919 by Col. G. W. L. Nicholson, CD, Queen's Printer, Ottawa, Ontario, 1962

References

Military units and formations established in 1914
Military units and formations disestablished in 1920
029
History of Vancouver
1914 establishments in British Columbia
Military units and formations of British Columbia
British Columbia Regiment (Duke of Connaught's Own)
Irish Fusiliers of Canada (The Vancouver Regiment)